Mary Edith Campbell sometimes known as Edith Campbell, was an American suffragist and social economist.

Biography
Campbell was born in 1875 or 1876.
In 1911 she was the first woman elected to the Board of Education in Cincinnati, Ohio with an endorsement from U.S. President William Howard Taft. In 1931 she was given an honorary degree.

Campbell was the first president of the Woman's City Club of Greater Cincinnati, She was a member of the Juvenile Protective Association and the Cincinnati League of Women Voters.

Campbell died in 1962, leaving her estate to Planned Parenthood of Cincinnati

See also
Women's suffrage in the United States

References

1870s births
1962 deaths
American suffragists
People from Cincinnati
School board members in Ohio
Activists from Ohio